Alt 92.3 can refer to the following radio stations in the United States:

 WZRH, an alternative station from LaPlace, Louisiana
 WNYL, a former alternative station from New York City, now WINS-FM